Maryam Ahmed Salama (born 1965) is a Libyan writer and poet, called by one reviewer "a leading light in the new generation of female Libyan writers." Her works are based on the position of women in contemporary Libyan society.

Career
Maryam Ahmed Salama was born in Tripoli, received her undergraduate degree from the Department of Literature and Culture at al-Fateh University in 1987.

Maryam Salama works currently in the field of translation with an emphasis on historical studies. Her works of prose and poetry have been published in Libyan and foreign newspapers and magazines, especially after a loosening of censorship laws in Libya in the 1990s. She currently works at the Old City Project in Tripoli, as a translator. In 2012 she participated in the Tripoli International Poetry Festival, organized by fellow Libyan poets Ashur Etwebi and Khaled Mattawa, the first such event in Libya since the fall of Muammar Gaddafi. Her works have been published in Libyan and Arab magazines as well as newspapers. Her works are based on position of women in contemporary Libyan society. She has included the theme in all her fiction and short stories.

List of works
 Dreams of an Imprisoned Child (poetry, 1992)
 Nothing but the Dream (poetry, 1992)
 "From Door to Door", a short story.

References

1965 births
Libyan novelists
Libyan poets
Living people
Libyan women writers
Women novelists
Libyan women poets
20th-century novelists
20th-century poets
20th-century women writers
People from Tripoli, Libya
University of Tripoli alumni
20th-century Libyan writers
20th-century Libyan women writers
21st-century Libyan women writers
21st-century Libyan writers